The between the sheets is a cocktail consisting of white rum (or other light rum), cognac, triple sec, and lemon juice. When made with gin, instead of rum and cognac, it's called a "maiden's prayer".

History
The origin of the cocktail is usually credited to Harry MacElhone at Harry's New York Bar in Paris in the 1930s as a derivative of the sidecar. However, competing theories exist that claim the cocktail was created at The Berkeley in approximately 1921, or in French brothels as an apéritif for consumption by the prostitutes.

Variations
The drink is similar to the sidecar, differing only by using less cognac and adding rum. The maiden's prayer is variously known as an alternate name for the between the sheets, and as a different drink using gin instead of rum and cognac, and adding orange juice to the lemon juice.

See also
 List of cocktails

References

Cocktails with light rum
Cocktails with triple sec or curaçao
Cocktails with brandy
Sour cocktails
Spirit-forward cocktails
Cocktails with gin
Cocktails with lemon juice